Laurence Burkinshaw (2 December 1891 – 1969) was an English professional footballer born in Kilnhurst, Yorkshire, who played as an outside right. He made 120 appearances in the Football League, playing for Sheffield Wednesday, Birmingham and Halifax Town.

References

1891 births
1969 deaths
People from Kilnhurst
English footballers
Association football wingers
Sheffield Wednesday F.C. players
Rotherham Town F.C. (1899) players
Birmingham City F.C. players
Halifax Town A.F.C. players
Mexborough Athletic F.C. players
English Football League players
Sportspeople from Yorkshire
Date of death missing